Alchemilla angustata is a species of flowering plant in the family Rosaceae, native to the Pyrenees. It was first described by Sigurd Erich Fröhner in 1998.

References

angustata
Flora of Spain
Plants described in 1998